Agioi Trimithias is a village located in the Nicosia District of Cyprus.

References

External links
https://web.archive.org/web/20090401071139/http://www.agiitrimithias.com/

Communities in Nicosia District